Gianni Patrignani (31 January 1906 – 2 August 1991) was an Italian swimmer. He competed in the men's 4 × 200 metre freestyle relay event at the 1924 Summer Olympics.

References

External links
 

1906 births
1991 deaths
Italian male swimmers
Olympic swimmers of Italy
Swimmers at the 1924 Summer Olympics
People from Pesaro
Italian male freestyle swimmers
Sportspeople from the Province of Pesaro and Urbino